Benjamin Richards-Everton (born 17 October 1991) is an English professional footballer who plays as a central defender for Scunthorpe United on loan from Yeovil Town. Richards-Everton has previously played for English non-league clubs Romulus, Cradley Town, Hinckley United, Tamworth and Barnet, as well as Scottish sides Partick Thistle, Airdrieonians and Dunfermline Athletic, and English League clubs Accrington Stanley and Bradford City.

Club career

Early career
Born in Birmingham, West Midlands, Richards-Everton joined Hinckley United from Cradley Town, where he spent two seasons with The Knitters, spending time out on loan with Sutton Coldfield Town, Rushall Olympic and former club Romulus.

Tamworth 
Being regarded as one of the best defenders in the league, he left Hinckley United in March 2013, to join Conference Premier side Tamworth. During December 2013, with continued good form, Richards-Everton attracted the attention of many higher English clubs. Tamworth were expected to sell the defender in January 2014 before his contract expired, but he stayed at the club until August 2014. Ben was tracked by a number of Football League and Premier League clubs, but on 22 August 2014, Richards-Everton signed for Partick Thistle, after impressing on a trial period earlier in the summer. He was immediately loaned to Scottish League One club Airdrieonians, making his debut on 23 August 2014, in a 3–0 defeat against Dunfermline Athletic.

Partick Thistle 
On 21 March 2015, Richards-Everton made his debut for Partick Thistle, coming on as a 90th-minute substitute for Steven Lawless, the goalscorer in a 1–0 victory against Inverness Caley Thistle at Firhill Stadium. Richards-Everton made his first start for Partick Thistle in a 0–0 draw with Motherwell playing the full 90 mins.

Dunfermline Athletic
At the end of the 2014–15 season Richards-Everton was released by Thistle, and in June 2015 he signed a one-year contract with Dunfermline Athletic. Richards-Everton made his first appearance for the side in a 3–0 friendly victory over local rivals East Fife, whilst his first competitive start came against Arbroath in the Scottish Challenge Cup. His first league appearance was against Brechin City in a 6–1 win, and he scored his first ever senior goal, and his first for the Pars, in a win against league rivals Stranraer on his 24th birthday. Richards-Everton was a consistent starter for the Pars, playing in all but two of the Pars League One winning campaign.

The 2016–17 season began in much the same way as the previous, with Richards-Everton starting in nine of the Pars' first 10 league and cup matches. Due to the club's poor performance in the league he was dropped from the starting 11 until 22 October against Hibernian. However, although playing the full 90 minutes against Hibs, and being chosen as the man of the match, Richards-Everton suffered a severe injury to his knee which saw him miss the remainder the season. Ben choose to leave the Pars, putting his injury problems behind him, pursuing a career south of the border.

Accrington Stanley
After leaving Dunfermline Athletic, Richards-Everton returned to England, signing a one-year deal with EFL League Two club Accrington Stanley on 15 July 2017. He scored his first goal in a very impressive performance for Accrington in a 3-2 EFL Cup win against Preston North End on 8 August 2017. Richards-Everton was sustained a shoulder injury during a game against Notts County, only returning to face Blackpool. Richards-Everton returned to fine form scoring in an impressive individual performance against Crawley. Ben came of the bench on Boxing Day and scored with his first shot of the game against Crewe Alexandria. Accrington exercised a contractual option at the end of the 2017–18 season to retain him.

Bradford City
In May 2019 Richard-Everton joined Bradford City on a 2-year deal. He left the club on 11 January 2021, by mutual consent.

Barnet
On 13 January 2021, Richards-Everton signed for National League side Barnet on a deal until at least the end of the 2022-23 season, with an option for a further year. Richards-Everton left the club in May 2022 having come to a mutual agreement with the club to terminate his contract.

Yeovil Town
On 29 July 2022, Richards-Everton signed for National League club Yeovil Town on a one-year deal.

On 15 February 2023, he joined Scunthorpe United on loan until the end of the season.

International career
In November 2013, Richards-Everton was called up to the England C squad, to face a Latvia under-23 side.

Career statistics

Honours

Club
Dunfermline Athletic
Scottish League One: 2015–16

References

External links

1991 births
Living people
Footballers from Birmingham, West Midlands
Association football defenders
English footballers
Scottish Professional Football League players
National League (English football) players
Romulus F.C. players
Cradley Town F.C. players
Hinckley United F.C. players
Sutton Coldfield Town F.C. players
Rushall Olympic F.C. players
Tamworth F.C. players
Partick Thistle F.C. players
Airdrieonians F.C. players
Dunfermline Athletic F.C. players
Accrington Stanley F.C. players
Bradford City A.F.C. players
Barnet F.C. players
Yeovil Town F.C. players
Scunthorpe United F.C. players
England semi-pro international footballers
English Football League players